Unison is the ninth studio album by Canadian singer Celine Dion and her first English-language album. Released on 2 April 1990 by Columbia Records, it features a mix of dance songs and ballads influenced by 1980s soft rock. The album was produced by David Foster, Christopher Neil, Andy Goldmark and Tom Keane. Upon its release, Unison received generally positive reviews from music critics, who complimented Dion's voice and technique, as well as the album's content.

On a commercial level, Unison reached number one in Quebec, number eight in Norway, and number 15 in Canada and Australia. It was certified seven-times Platinum in Canada, Platinum in the United States, Gold in the United Kingdom and France, and has sold over four million copies worldwide. Up to five singles were released from Unison, depending on the country. "Where Does My Heart Beat Now" became a top five hit on the Billboard Hot 100, reaching number four. The next US single, "(If There Was) Any Other Way," peaked at number 35. In 1991 Unison won the Juno Award for Album of the Year, and Dion won the Juno Award for Female Vocalist of the Year.

Background
In the 1980s, Dion released eleven French-language albums in Canada and three in France. One compilation album was issued in Europe. In Canada, Incognito (1987) was certified two-times Platinum, Tellement j'ai d'amour... (1982) Platinum, and Les chemins de ma maison (1983) and Mélanie (1984) Gold. Dion topped the Quebec chart with hits like "D'amour ou d'amitié", "Mon ami m'a quittée", "Incognito", "Lolita (trop jeune pour aimer)", "Comme un cœur froid" and "D'abord, c'est quoi l'amour". "D'amour ou d'amitié" and "Une colombe" were certified Gold in Canada. During this decade, Dion won fifteen Félix Awards, including Newcomer of the Year, Female Vocalist of the Year, Album of the Year (Melanie), Pop Album of the Year (Tellement j'ai d'amour...), Best Selling Album of the Year (Les chemins de ma maison, Melanie), Most Popular Song of the Year ("Une colombe", "Incognito"), Best Selling Single of the Year ("Une colombe"), Best Stage Performance of the Year (Incognito tournée), and Artist of the Year Achieving the Most Success Outside Quebec. In France, Dion became the first Canadian artist to receive a Gold record for her top ten single "D'amour ou d'amitié". Further success in Europe came when she represented Switzerland in the Eurovision Song Contest 1988 with the song, "Ne partez pas sans moi", which later won the contest.

CBS Records had originally offered $25,000 to make the album, which would allow Dion to record new vocals over the original music tracks from Incognito. Three events would raise the ante. First, Dion performed a duet with Dan Hill on "Can't We Try" at the CBS Canada 1987 convention. The performance impressed the company's president Bernie DiMatteo enough for him to raise the budget to $100,000 so that some new songs could be commissioned. Next, at the Juno Awards of 1987 she sang "Have a Heart". After that performance the budget rose to $300,000. When David Foster later saw it on videotape, he told DiMatteo that $300,000 was not enough, so they were given an unlimited budget. The record ended up costing $600,000. Unison was recorded in London, New York, and Los Angeles.

Before releasing Unison in 1990, "Can't Live With You, Can't Live Without You", a duet with Billy Newton-Davis was issued as a single in Canada in 1989 from his album, Spellbound. Dion also sang a duet with Warren Wiebe on "Listen to Me", taken from the American dramatic film of the same name. The third duet recorded in 1989 was again with Dan Hill on "Wishful Thinking" from his album, Real Love. However, these duets were not included on Unison.

Content and release
Unison includes four songs produced by British record producer, Christopher Neil, who previously worked with artists like Sheena Easton, Mike + The Mechanics, and Shakin' Stevens. Neil produced three singles on the album, including the successful "Where Does My Heart Beat Now" and a cover of Sheena Easton song, "The Last to Know". Five songs were produced by Canadian record producer and composer, David Foster. His production work included "Have a Heart", which was originally recorded in French for Dion's 1987 album, Incognito. Andy Goldmark produced the cover of Junior's song for the Tom Cruise movie, All the Right Moves, "Unison".

The album, with ten tracks, was released on 2 April 1990 in Canada and on 11 September 1990 in the United States. In other parts of the world, Unison was issued on 21 February 1991 in Japan, on 4 March 1991 in Australia, and on 16 September 1991 in the United Kingdom.

Singles
Five singles from Unison were released in Canada: "(If There Was) Any Other Way" in March 1990, "Unison" in July 1990, "Where Does My Heart Beat Now" in September 1990,  "The Last to Know" in March 1991, and "Have a Heart" in July 1991. All singles reached top forty in Canada, with "Where Does My Heart Beat Now" peaking at number six. They were also successful on the Canadian Adult Contemporary chart. Four of them reached top ten, and "Where Does My Heart Beat Now" topped the Adult Contemporary chart for two weeks.

In the United States, "Where Does My Heart Beat Now" was released as the lead single in September 1990. It was followed by "(If There Was) Any Other Way" in March 1991 and "The Last to Know" in June 1991. "Where Does My Heart Beat Now" became Dion's first US top ten hit. The song reached number four on the Billboard Hot 100. "(If There Was) Any Other Way" peaked at number thirty-five there. All three songs also charted on the US Adult Contemporary chart where the most successful "Where Does My Heart Beat Now" peaked at number two. In early 1991, "Where Does My Heart Beat Now" was released as the first single from Unison outside North America. It was successful in Norway, reaching number four. "Where Does My Heart Beat Now" peaked inside the top forty in Ireland, France, Belgium, Netherlands, and New Zealand. It also charted in Australia and the United Kingdom.

Promotion
On 6 May 1989, Dion opened the Eurovision Song Contest with a performance of her previous year's winning song, "Ne partez pas sans moi", and "Where Does My Heart Beat Now", a track from the upcoming English-language album Unison. In 1990 and 1991, Dion promoted Unison on various television shows. Her first American television appearance was on The Tonight Show, where she performed "Where Does My Heart Beat Now" on 21 September 1990. Dion sang the same song on The Tonight Show again on 15 November 1990. Other US performances included: "Where Does My Heart Beat Now" on Good Morning America, Live with Regis and Kathie Lee, and Into the Night with Rick Dees; "Where Does My Heart Beat Now" and  "(If There Was) Any Other Way" on Super Dave; and "The Last to Know" on The Tonight Show.

In Canada, Dion performed "Where Does My Heart Beat Now" during the Juno Awards of 1991. She also sang "(If There Was) Any Other Way", "Unison", and "Where Does My Heart Beat Now" on various Canadian television shows. Dion promoted Unison with her sold-out Unison Tour in Canada as well. Performances on television shows in other countries included "Where Does My Heart Beat Now" in the Netherlands in 1990, in France on Le Monde Est À Vous on 7 April 1991; and "(If There Was) Any Other Way" and "Where Does My Heart Beat Now" in Norway in 1991.

Critical reception

The album was largely influenced by the 1980s soft rock sound that was a fit for the adult contemporary radio format. Unison hit all the right notes with most critics: Jim Farber of Entertainment Weekly wrote that Dion's vocals were "tastefully unadorned" and that she never attempted to "bring off styles that are beyond her". Stephen Thomas Erlewine of AllMusic declared it as "a fine, sophisticated American debut". Jan De Knock of the Chicago Tribune said that "though Dion's big voice invites comparisons to the power-pop stylings of Taylor Dayne and Laura Branigan...she also has a deft touch with an R&B groove".

Commercial performance
In Canada, Unison reached number fifteen and was certified seven-times Platinum. It also topped the chart in Quebec for nine weeks. 

In the United States, it peaked at number seventy-four and has sold over 1.2 million copies achieving Platinum certification. Billboard ranked Dion as the 11th Top Pop Singles Female Artists of 1991 in the United States, as well as the 8th Top Adult Contemporary Artist of 1991. Unison reached number eight in Norway, number fifty-five in the United Kingdom, and also charted in Belgium. It was certified Gold in the United Kingdom and France. 

In Australia, it charted as a combo with Celine Dion in 1992 and peaked at number fifteen and was certified Gold. Unison has sold over four million copies worldwide.

Accolades

At the Juno Awards of 1991, Dion won Album of the Year (Unison) and Female Vocalist of the Year. It was the first time in Juno Awards history that a French-Canadian artist had taken top honors in these categories. "Unison" (Mainstream Mix) was also nominated for Best Dance Recording, and David Foster was nominated in the Producer of the Year category for "Have a Heart" and "Love by Another Name". At the Juno Awards of 1992, Dion again won Female Vocalist of the Year and was nominated for Canadian Entertainer of the Year. In 1990, she received the Félix Award for Anglophone Artist of the Year but publicly refused it, not considering herself an Anglophone artist. In 1991, Dion won the Félix Award for Artist of the Year Achieving the Most Success in a Language Other Than French and was nominated for Artist of the Year Achieving the Most Success Outside Quebec. The Unison Tour won the Félix Award for Stage Director of the Year and was nominated for Lighting Designer of the Year.

The Unison Tour also received the Platinum Ticket Award for selling over 100,000 tickets in Quebec alone. In 1992, Dion was nominated for the Gemini Award for Best Performance in a Variety Program or Series for her performance of "Where Does My Heart Beat Now" at the Juno Awards of 1991. "Where Does My Heart Beat Now" also won the ASCAP Pop Award for Most Performed Song in the United States. Additionally the Céline Dion – Unison and Céline Dion: 10 ans déjà television specials were nominated for various Gémeaux Awards in 1990 and 1992, respectively. Céline Dion – Unison won the Gémeaux Award for Best Variety Special.

Track listing

Personnel
Adapted from AllMusic.

 Celine Dion – lead vocals, background vocals
 René Angélil – personal manager
 John Barnes – keyboards, synclavier, synthesizer, vocoder
 Andy Batwinas – assistant engineer, mixing assistant
 Paul Bliss – drums, keyboard programming, keyboards, programming, background vocals
 Michael Boddicker – percussion, programming, synthesizer, synthesizer programming
 Rev. Dave Boruff – programming, synthesizer programming
 Richard Bowen  – programming
 Rick Bowen – programming, synthesizer, synthesizer programming
 Mike Brooks – engineer
 Robbie Buchanan – keyboards, programming
 Alan Carvell – background vocals
 Keith "KC" Cohen – mixing
 David Dachinger – engineer, programming
 Andy Duncan – drums and percussion (track 3)
 Chris Earthy – production coordination
 Charles Fearing – guitar
 David Foster – arranger and producer (tracks 5, 8), keyboards, background vocals
 Humberto Gatica – engineer, mixing
 Andy Goldmark – arranger, drum programming, keyboards, producer, programming, synthesizer, synthesizer bass
 Art Graham – artwork
 Simon Hurrell – engineer
 Paul Jackson Jr. – guitar
 Randy Jackson – bass (track 5)
 Tom Keane – arranger, keyboards, producer, programming, synthesizer, synthesizer programming, background vocals
 Randy Kerber – arranger, keyboards, programming, synthesizer programming
 Michael Landau – guitar, soloist
 Laura Livingston – assistant engineer, mixing assistant
 Vito Luprano – executive producer, producer
 Clif Magness – keyboards, programming
 Francis Manzella – programming
 Stan Meissner – arranger
 Christopher Neil – producer (tracks: 1-4), background vocals
 Aldo Nova – arranger
 Phil Palmer – guitar
 Paul Pesco – guitar
 Steve Pigott – bass and drums (track 4), keyboards, percussion
 Ruth Pointer – background vocals
 Jeff Porcaro – drums
 Dave Reitzas – assistant engineer, percussion
 Norene Rill – production coordination
 Bob Rosa – mixing
 Jack Rouben – engineer
 Biti Strauchn – percussion, voices
 Hugh Syme – artwork
 Linda Taylor – background vocals
 Fonzi Thornton – background vocals
 Freddie "Ready Freddie" Washington – bass
 Paul "Wix" Wickens – bass, keyboards (track 3)
 Jeffrey "Woody" Woodruff – engineer
 Richard Zuckerman – executive producer, producer

Charts

Weekly charts

Year-end charts

Certifications and sales

Release history

See also
 Juno Award for Album of the Year

References

External links
 

1990 albums
Celine Dion albums
Albums produced by David Foster
Albums produced by Christopher Neil
Albums produced by Aldo Nova
Juno Award for Album of the Year albums
Epic Records albums
Sony Music Canada albums